Duravit AG, founded in 1817 and headquartered in Hornberg, Germany, is primarily a manufacturer of porcelain bathroom fittings. Duravit is notable for having employed prominent designers such as Philippe Starck, sieger design, EOOS, Phoenix Design, Frank Huster, Christian Werner, Matteo Thun & Antonio Rodriguez, Cecilie Manz, Kurt Merki Jr., Bertrand Lejoly and Sebastian Herkner  for its product lines. In recent years, the company has diversified its scope to include other products.

History

Founded as a small earthenware factory by Georg Friedrich Horn in 1817 in the Black Forest, Duravit did not begin to produce sanitary fixtures until the early 20th century such as sinks, bidets, and toilets. In the 1980s, the product line was expanded to offer bathroom accessories. The 1980s and 1990s were also characterized by various corporate acquisitions, including "Ceramique de Bischwiller in 1991, "MISR TECH" in 1999, and a partial stake in Laufen. This period also saw the further growth of product lines, including the introduction of bathroom furniture. In 1994, Duravit opened a new, modern plant for the production of sanitary ceramics. 

Duravit's expansion continued in the first decade of the 21st Century with the establishment of subsidiaries in Turkey, India and China. The Duravit Design Center in Hornberg, designed by Philippe Starck, was also completed during this time. The brand is currently available in over 130 countries.

Factory sites 
There are production facilities at several locations in Germany and abroad: Hornberg, Schenkenzell and Meißen in Germany, and in Bischwiller (France), Cairo (Egypt), Chongqing (China), Bizerte (Tunisia) and Tarapur (India) out of the country.

References

Companies based in Baden-Württemberg
German brands
Bathrooms